is a Japanese manga series written and illustrated by . It has been serialized on Kodansha's Magazine Pocket website and app since March 2022.

Characters

Protagonists 
 
 Spica is the main female protagonist of the series.
 
 Claude is the main male protagonist of the series.

Royal Diana Academy

Students 
 
 
 
 A classmate and a friend of Spica.
 
 A classmate of Spica.
 
 A classmate of Spica and the son of the vice-headmaster.
 
 A classmate of Spica.
 
 A classmate of Spica.
 
 A classmate of Spica.
 
 A classmate of Spica.
 
 A classmate of Spica.
 
 A classmate of Spica.
 
 A classmate of Spica.
 
 A classmate of Spica.

Staff 
 
 The homeroom teacher of Spica.
 
 
 The vice-headmaster of the academy.
 
 The headmistress of the academy and the master of Claude.

Publication 

Volume list

See also 
Boarding School Juliet - Another manga series by the same author

References

Further reading

External links 
  at Magazine Pocket 

Comics about cats
Fantasy anime and manga
Japanese webcomics
Kodansha manga
Romantic comedy anime and manga
Shōnen manga
Webcomics in print
Witchcraft in anime and manga